Profile Zali Futsal Club (Persian: باشگاه فوتسال پروفیل زالی مشهد) is an Iranian futsal club based in Mashhad, Iran.They currently compete in the Iran Futsal's 1st Division, the 2nd tier of Iranian futsal.

History

Establishment
The club was originally known as Etemad Iranian, competing in the Iran Futsal's 1st Division in the 2011-12 season with bought Farsh Ara licence. In the 2012–13 season it was renamed Profile Zali Mashhad due to change of sponsorship.

Season-by-season 
The table below chronicles the achievements of the Club in various competitions.

References 

Futsal clubs in Iran
Sport in Mashhad
Futsal clubs established in 2011
2011 establishments in Iran